Nanjing Education and Technology Channel is a television channel in Jiangsu Province, China, owned by Nanjing Broadcast and Television Corporation. It broadcasts numerous programs including Classic Theater which shows many hit TV series, and other programs like Rule of Law on the Spot and Dong Fang is on Line. These programs focus on hot social issues such as environment problems, education problems, labour problems, crime problems, poverty problems and so forth.

Current situation
On September 27, 2010, the channel has been given a brand-new revision, with host Dong Fa and anchorwoman Zhang Xu cooperating to host the new program - Hello Nanjing. It includes news, public opinion and supervision, and accepts content from citizen journalists.  According to the reporter of the channel, the revised channel features for its authoritative programmes of law and the humanistic programmes satisfying the audiences of the emotional appeals. It is one of the most competitive brands in media service.

Programs

Rule of Law on the Spot
Every night:19:00 ~ 20:10
Host:Fang Fang
Rule of Law on the Spot is a news program, and it has received numerous national awards for its high-quality news and programmes. In 2003 it had the honour to win the annual China News Award. Over the years, It has kept high ratings of its time in Nanjing area. It provides the audience with fresh news and information about the law. The new program continues to play characteristic of the rule of law, and pays attention to people's livelihood. The goal of the program is to focus more on justice line, and cooperate with police, procuratorate, court, judicial administration, traffic administration more closely, to show more real-world examples and provide more legal aid.

Dong Fang is on line
Monday to Thursday: 20:00 ~ 21:00
Host:Dong Fang
An emotional TV talk-show, it mainly records people's ordinary life, focusing on their joy, anger, grief, joy from a plain view and caring eye, showing the fate, emotion of figures in modern social context. The program lets every audience look for and find his (her) story, comprehending life and absorbing the essence of life and mental health. More attention is paid to social assistance and humanistic care.  The program takes The Presenters Center System, it has larger efforts to reform and innovation in program production and operation mechanism.

Hello Nanjing
Monday to Sunday: 17:50 ~ 19:00
Host:Dong Fang
The program includes news and public opinion and supervision. Hello Nanjing is the revision of the original program-"Live Coverage". Anchorwoman Zhang Xu cooperates with the famous host Dong Fang to host the program. The goal of the program is not to only concentrate on broadcasting the important news that happen in Nanjing everyday, but also show the opinions of internet users towards network news and events. It also includes reporters'penetrating investigation of the news fact.

I Want a Home
Saturday to Sunday: 20:00~21:00
In many types of marriage and dating shows, I Want a Home is consistent with real for the foundation of the program. It plays a role of a matchmaker to help guests find their true love. According to the staff, service is the purpose of the program, it also want to give publicity to the correct view on love and marriage. After the revision, the special edition consists of  Love Story, Speak Your Love and Wedding Videos Collected by Zhanbo.

Activity

Millions of Anchorwomen
Millions Anchorwomen is one of the important activities undertaken by Nanjing Education and Technology Channel  in the year of 2011. It was a large-scale general entertainment reality show which is organized by Nanjing Radio and Television corporation and Youku network. According to the channel, it raised ordinary girls nationwide who are passionate, ambitious and longing for anchor work. The purpose of the show is to select anchor talents and realize numerous young girls' dreams.

Main Hosts and Hostesses of the channel

Dong Fang
Dong Fang is a famous host of Nanjing Television Station with 12 years of working experience. He has engaged in the work of television programs since 1993. Dong Fang has a great  fresh and natural hosting style. Thus he is loved by the majority of audience. He once hosted Rule of Law on the Spot, A Myriad Twinkling Lights and others. At present, he is hosting the program, Dong Fang is on Line.

Achievements:
Nominated for National radio and television host "Golden Microphone" Award.

Won the first prize of 23rd Jiangsu Province Golden Phoenix Award Hosting class.

Won the first prize of National television rule of law programs host.

Fang Fang
One of the chief hosts of Nanjing Broadcasting and Television Corporation. By the end of 1992, he was admitted to Economic Channel of Nanjing People's broadcasting Station. He founded the chat show in the evening named Midnight Heart Bridge in early 1993 and hosted the program for 12 years. In November 2004, he joined Nanjing Education and Technology Channel, and hosted Rule of Law on the Spot.

Achievements:
Nominated for National radio and television host "Golden Microphone"  Award. (2009)

Won the title of "advanced worker" of broadcast TV system in jiangsu province  (enjoy treatment of municipal labor model)

Lu Guowei
She is a famous and experienced hostess of Nanjing Television Station. The hostess of the program Please Welcome Persons Involved (special edition). She has been a hostess since 1989 and has hosted different kinds of programs such as After Work, The Life of the Party, Weekend Art and others.

Achievements:
Won the Jiangsu rule of law publicity and advanced individual (2000−2005)

Channels of Nanjing Broadcast and Television Corporation

Television 

Radio

Nanjing Television Station
Nanjing Television Station ranks top among the national capital city television stations with its comprehensive strength. Currently it has Comprehensive News,  Education and Technology Channel ', the Television Channel, Live Channel, Entertainment channel, Eighteen Channel, Information Channel and Children's Channel .

References

Television stations in China
Mass media in Nanjing